Gyeongsan station is a railway station on the Gyeongbu Line.

External links
 Cyber station information from Korail

Railway stations in North Gyeongsang Province
Gyeongsan
Railway stations in Korea opened in 1905
Korea Train Express stations